William Barrymore may refer to: 

 William Barrymore (stage actor) (1759–1830), British stage actor
 William Barrymore (film actor) (1899–1979), Russian-born American film actor